Joe Paopao (born June 30, 1955) is a former professional Canadian football quarterback and coach in the Canadian Football League (CFL). Paopao played 11 seasons in the CFL and was a member of the BC Lions, Saskatchewan Roughriders and the Ottawa Rough Riders. He began his coaching career with the BC Lions and has coached with five CFL organizations, including stints as head coach with the BC Lions in 1996 and the Ottawa Renegades from 2002–2005. He most recently served as the quarterbacks coach for the Ottawa Redblacks.

Professional playing career
Paopao began his CFL career as a quarterback for the BC Lions in 1978.  He was nicknamed the "Throwin' Samoan" for his great ability to pass, as he led the Lions in passing for the next three seasons and set a CFL record in 1979 for pass completions in a single game.  By 1983, he had lost the starting job to Roy Dewalt.  In 1984 he signed with the Saskatchewan Roughriders and again led that team in passing.  He was traded to the Ottawa Rough Riders in 1987, and the following year to the Winnipeg Blue Bombers. That year, he was named the offensive backfield coach of the BC Lions, thus beginning his CFL coaching career. The next year however, he went back to his old position of quarterback for the Lions, backing up Doug Flutie, in his last season.

Coaching career

Early CFL coaching career 
In 1991, Paopao was made the quarterback coach of the Lions. In 1992 he was promoted to offensive coordinator. Paopao was with the Lions for four seasons to begin his coaching career. Paopao then left to be the offensive coordinator for the Edmonton Eskimos in 1994. In 1996 Paopao returned to BC to be the head coach, but he only managed to win 5 games and lost 13 during his only season as the Lions head coach. Following his first stint as a head coach Paopao was hired by the Blue Bombers as the team's offensive coordinator, a position which he held for two seasons. He once again returned to the Lions in 1999 and as the offensive coordinator and assistant head coach.

San Francisco Demons 
Paopao was hired as the offensive coordinator for the San Francisco Demons of the XFL. The league was operational for only one season, and thus Paopao was once again looking for work.

Ontario 
In 2001 Paopao was hired as the head coach of the new Ottawa Renegades franchise where he coached for four seasons from 2002-2005. However, the Renegades struggled, winning only 23 games and losing 49, the team folded following the 2005 season. Paopao was then hired by the Hamilton Tiger-Cats and named offensive coordinator for the 2006 season. He was later relieved of his duties with the Tiger-Cats on August 28, 2006.

University of Waterloo 
Paopao joined the University of Waterloo Warriors as the team's offensive coordinator and assistant head coach in 2007, a position he would hold for five years. He was named the team's interim head coach for the 2012 season after Dennis McPhee's resignation, and then full-time head coach in February 2013. In two seasons with the Warriors, Paopao had a 3-13 record.

Return to BC 
On February 6, 2014, the BC Lions announced Paopao would be re-joining the organization as its receivers coach.

Simon Fraser University 
On March 27, 2015 Joe Paopao was named offensive coordinator of the Simon Fraser University Clan football team in the NCAA's Division II Great Northwest Athletic Conference.

Return to Ottawa 
On April 15, 2019 Paopao was hired by the Ottawa Redblacks as a running backs coach. Midway through the 2019 season, with the offense sputtering and the team having lost six of their last seven matches, head coach Rick Campbell turned over the role of offensive play-calling to Paopao: His responsibilities with the team also changed from running backs coach to quarterbacks coach. Following a head coaching change, Paopao was not retained by the Redblacks for the 2020 season.

Personal life
Paopao is a longtime resident of Oceanside, California. He was added to the BC Lions Wall of Fame in 2007.

CFL coaching record

CIS coaching record

See also
 List of University of Waterloo people

References

1955 births
Living people
American sportspeople of Samoan descent
BC Lions players
California State University, Long Beach alumni
Canadian football quarterbacks
Edmonton Elks coaches
Winnipeg Blue Bombers coaches
Ottawa Renegades coaches
BC Lions coaches
Long Beach State 49ers football players
Ottawa Rough Riders players
Sportspeople from Honolulu
Saskatchewan Roughriders players
Players of American football from Honolulu
Winnipeg Blue Bombers players
Sportspeople from Oceanside, California
American players of Canadian football
San Francisco Demons coaches
Simon Fraser Clan football coaches
Waterloo Warriors football coaches
Players of Canadian football from Honolulu